Henry James Friel (15 April 1823 – 16 May 1869) was mayor of Bytown in 1854 and then of Ottawa in 1863 and 1868–1869.

He was born in Montreal of Irish Catholic parents Charles Friel and Cecila Brennan on 15 April 1823. His family moved to Bytown, which was later renamed Ottawa, in 1827.

Political life 
Friel was elected to Bytown's first town council in 1847. He was defeated the following year, but elected alderman in 1850, 1853 and 1854, when he was elected mayor. He also served on the executive of the Bytown Mechanics' Institute. In 1849 when rioting broke out over a proposed visit by Governor General Elgin Bruce, Friel was among those arrested for abetting the looting of the government arsenal at Hull to supply arms to the Reform rioters.

The municipality of Bytown became the new city of Ottawa in 1855. Friel was elected alderman there from 1855 to 1858 and in 1864, 1865 and 1867. In 1863, he was a member of the first Board of Police Commissioners for Ottawa. The board, with the aim of avoiding unnecessary expense, originally concluded that there was no need for a salaried police force in the city. However, in May that same year, the militia had to be called in to control a riot in the city. In 1865, a bylaw was introduced establishing an official police force. In 1868, while mayor, Friel posted a proclamation announcing a $2,000 reward for information leading to the conviction of the assassin of Thomas D'Arcy McGee.

Professional life 
In 1846, he purchased the Bytown Packet, a local newspaper, with John George Bell. He sold this paper in October 1849 to Robert Bell, who renamed it the Ottawa Citizen in 1849. In 1858, he established a new paper, the Ottawa Union, also referred to as the Daily Union. He later sold it to a rival paper, the Ottawa Times in 1866.

Personal life 
Henry James Friel was born April 15th, 1823 in Montreal of Irish Catholic parents Charles Friel and Cecila Brennan. His family moved to Bytown, which was later renamed Ottawa, in 1827.

He died in Ottawa in 1869 of pneumonia while still in office. His funeral sermon was delivered in Notre-Dame Cathedral (Ottawa) on Wednesday, 19 May 1869 by Aeneas Mcdonell Dawson.

References

Bibliography

External links

Biography at the Dictionary of Canadian Biography Online

1823 births
1869 deaths
Mayors of Ottawa
Canadian male journalists
Canadian people of Irish descent
Journalists from Montreal
Journalists from Ontario
Politicians from Montreal
Writers from Montreal
Writers from Ottawa
Ottawa Citizen people
19th-century Canadian journalists
19th-century Canadian male writers